Eric Shilling (12 October 192015 February 2006) was an English opera singer and producer, long associated with English National Opera. He was married to the soprano Erica Johns, and they have two sons the oldest is George Shilling. He was born and died in London.

Life and career
Shilling learnt about singing from his father, who sang music-hall songs at home. He was educated at Leyton Sixth Form College. He began work in the oil business, but then decided that he wanted a singing career, and entered the Guildhall School of Music and Drama, studying with Walter Hyde, and then at the Royal College of Music under Clive Carey.

During the Second World War, Shilling was a conscientious objector and worked for the rescue services, assisting victims at bomb sites.
Shilling made his debut as Marullo in Rigoletto at Sadler's Wells Theatre in 1945, and followed this with several years touring the UK and abroad with a small company ‘Intimate Opera’, also producing their piano-accompanied repertoire.

In 1959 he joined Sadler's Wells Opera as a principal, singing many comic and dramatic roles, from Jupiter in Orpheus in the Underworld, to Rostov in the British stage premiere of War and Peace in 1972. He created roles in Our Man in Havana (title role, 1963), The Violins of St Jacques (1966), A Penny for a Song (1967), The Story of Vasco (1974) and Clarissa (1990). He appeared at the Proms in 1975 (Frank in Die Fledermaus) and 1976 (Colonel Calverley in Patience), and took part in the complete BBC broadcast of Havergal Brian's The Tigers in 1983.

He appeared in a BBC studio recording of Offenbach's Un mari à la porte in 1971, and also in 1976 the musical Liza of Lambeth at the Shaftesbury Theatre.

Grove noted Shilling's impeccable diction and mastery of stagecraft. Later in his career he taught at his alma mater, the Royal College of Music.

Recordings and television
Shilling took part in recordings of Béatrice et Bénédict, La Vie parisienne, Orpheus in the Underworld, Irmelin and Iolanthe. He was the narrator in the Supraphon recording of Peter and the Wolf with the Czech Philharmonic Orchestra conducted by Karel Ančerl.
He also appeared in several Gilbert and Sullivan productions on radio and television.

References

1920 births
2006 deaths
Operatic bass-baritones
Academics of the Royal College of Music
Alumni of the Royal College of Music
20th-century British male opera singers